Jake Matijevic (or Jake M) is a pyramidal rock on the surface of Aeolis Palus, between Peace Vallis and Aeolis Mons ("Mount Sharp"), in Gale crater on the planet Mars.  The approximate site coordinates are: .
 
The rock was encountered by the Curiosity rover on the way from Bradbury Landing to Glenelg Intrigue in September 2012 and measures about  height and  width.

The rock was named by NASA after Jacob Matijevic (1947–2012), a mathematician-turned-rover-engineer, who played a critical role in the design of the six-wheeled rover, but died just days after the Curiosity rover landed in August 2012. Matijevic was the surface operations systems chief engineer for the Mars Science Laboratory Project and the project's Curiosity rover. He was also a leading engineer for all of the previous NASA Mars rovers including Sojourner, Spirit and Opportunity.

The rover team determined the rock to be a suitable target for the first use of Curiositys contact instruments, the Mars Hand Lens Imager (MAHLI) and the Alpha particle X-ray spectrometer (APXS).

Analytical studies, performed on the rock by the Curiosity rover in October 2012, suggest the Jake M rock is an igneous rock but found to be high in elements consistent with feldspar, such as sodium, aluminum and potassium, and lower concentrations of magnesium, iron and nickel than other such rocks previously found on Mars. The mineral content and elemental abundance indicates Jake M rock may be a mugearite, a sodium rich oligoclase-bearing basaltic trachyandesite. Igneous rocks similar to the Jake M rock are well known but occur rarely on Earth. On Earth, such rocks form when magma, usually found in volcanoes, rises to the surface, cools and partially solidifies with certain chemical elements, while the warmer liquid magma portion becomes enriched with the left-behind elements. The Jake M rock is a ventifact with a volcanic fabric. Its pyramidal shape was formed by eolian drifted  grains of sand. The little cavities on its surface were formed by the blast-effect, which is caused by different flow dynamics at the micro-relief. On the surface one could see the marks of the main wind direction, by which Jake M was formed. On September 27, 2013, NASA scientists reported that Jake M rock was a mugearite and very similar to terrestrial mugearite rocks.

See also
 

 Aeolis quadrangle 
 Composition of Mars 
 Geology of Mars
 List of rocks on Mars
 Matijevic Hill
 Mugearite
 Timeline of Mars Science Laboratory

References

External links
 Mars Rock Touched by NASA Curiosity has Surprises, a NASA press release about the rock's composition
 Curiosity rover - Official Site
 Volcanic rock classification 
 Roca Jake Matijevic (in spanish) 

Aeolis quadrangle
Mars Science Laboratory
Rocks on Mars